William Windom (September 28, 1923 – August 16, 2012) was an American actor. He was known as a character actor of the stage and screen. He is best known for his recurring role as Dr. Seth Hazlitt alongside Angela Lansbury in the CBS mystery series Murder, She Wrote (1984–1996). 

Windom made his television debut in 1949 in the NBC anthology series The Philco Television Playhouse. He continued acting in shows such as Studio One, Masterpiece Playhouse, Omnibus, and Kraft Television Theatre. During this time, he also appeared on The Twilight Zone, Gunsmoke, Mission: Impossible, and Star Trek. He then gained acclaim in his television career for his portrayal of cartoonist John Monroe in the short-lived NBC sitcom My World and Welcome to It (1969–1970), winning him the Primetime Emmy Award for Outstanding Lead Actor in a Comedy Series. 

He then guest-starred in various programs, including Columbo, Night Gallery, Marcus Welby M.D., and Quincy M.E. before gaining acclaim for his recurring role on the CBS mystery series Murder, She Wrote (1986-1996), portraying Dr. Seth Hazlitt of Cabot Cove opposite Angela Lansbury. During this time, he also appeared on other programs, including St. Elsewhere, Magnum, P.I., Newhart, L.A. Law, and Murphy Brown, and voiced Uncle Chuck in Sonic the Hedgehog. His final television appearances include roles in Ally McBeal and The District.

Windom is also known for his film roles in the Academy Award-winning movie To Kill a Mockingbird (1962), The Americanization of Emily (1964), The Detective (1968), Brewster McCloud (1970), Escape from the Planet of the Apes (1971), Planes, Trains and Automobiles (1987), She's Having a Baby (1988), Uncle Buck (1989), Miracle on 34th Street (1994), and True Crime (1999).

Early life
Windom was born in Manhattan in New York City, the son of Isobel Wells (née Peckham) and Paul Windom, an architect. He was the great-grandson of the United States secretary of the treasury of the same name, whom the actor resembled. He attended Williams College and enlisted in the U.S. Army. He participated in the Army Specialized Training Program, studying at The Citadel, Antioch College, and the University of Kentucky.

Windom became a paratrooper with Company B, 1st Battalion 508th Parachute Infantry Regiment, 82nd Airborne Division. While stationed in Frankfurt during the Allied occupation of Germany, he enrolled in Biarritz American University in France and became involved in theater.

Career
His screen career began in the 1950s. Windom appeared in various TV series, including Omnibus and Robert Montgomery Presents. He continued guest-starring in series during the 1960s including playing The Major in "Five Characters in Search of an Exit", a 1961 episode of The Twilight Zone; Windom considered this guest appearance as his West Coast television debut. He later reported that Richard Widmark was originally offered the role, but when Widmark learned that the pay was only to be $1,000, he turned it down. Actress Susan Harrison, who played the Ballerina, got first billing, while Windom got second. 

His first leading role came in the sitcom The Farmer's Daughter (1963–1966), a series based on the 1947 film about a young Minnesota woman (played by Inger Stevens) who became the housekeeper for a widowed congressman (Windom). It ran for three seasons.

Windom's first role in film was alongside Gregory Peck in the Oscar-winning movie To Kill a Mockingbird (1962); he played Horace Gilmer, the prosecutor of Tom Robinson (Brock Peters).

He appeared on The Donna Reed Show, Gunsmoke, Star Trek, and Ironside.

In Star Trek, he played Commodore Matt Decker, commander of the doomed USS Constellation in the 1967 episode "The Doomsday Machine", a role he reprised nearly 40 years later for Star Trek: New Voyages. He played a recurring role (3 episodes) in "The Invaders" in 1967. In 1968, Windom guest-starred on Ironside in the episode "Trip to Hashbury." 

Also, in 1968, Windom starred alongside Peter Falk and Gene Barry in the TV movie Prescription: Murder, the pilot for the TV series Columbo. He starred in another edition of the series titled "Short Fuse" in 1972. In 1971 he played a supporting role alongside Jimmy Stewart, George Kennedy and Kurt Russell in the Columbia production Fools' Parade.

Windom starred with Frank Sinatra in the film The Detective (1968), playing a homophobic killer, a role appreciated in The New York Times. The following year, he had the lead role as cartoonist John Monroe in the sitcom My World and Welcome to It. Although the series only aired for one season, he won the 1970 Primetime Emmy Award for Outstanding Lead Actor in a Comedy Series.

In 1971, Windom guest-starred as a victim of blackmail on Cannon in the episode "Death Chain". Later, in 1975, he guest-starred as George Kane, a desperate drug dealer, in the series finale of Mannix in the episode "Hardball". 

In 1980, he appeared as Amos Krebbs, the alleged father of Ray Krebbs, on the hit primetime television drama Dallas on the episode "The Fourth Son". 
 
Windom toured the country in a one-man James Thurber show. Afterward, he filmed the pilot for a new series Is There a Doctor in the House? with Rosemary Forsyth that was not picked up by a network. 

Windom joined Murder, She Wrote in October 1985 as Dr. Seth Hazlitt. He had previously appeared on the series as a guest star playing another character in April 1985. The producers invited him thereafter to return at the beginning of the second season in a continuing role. Windom briefly left the show in 1990 to work on the first television version of Parenthood, based on the 1989 film of the same name, playing the role of patriarch Frank Buckman--a role played by Jason Robards in the film and, later, Craig T. Nelson in the second TV version. The show was cancelled after 12 episodes and Windom returned to Murder, She Wrote as a semiregular. Windom appeared in 53 episodes of Murder, She Wrote, second only to Lansbury.

Windom continued to appear in film and TV guest roles during the 1990s and 2000s, including Sommersby (1993), Miracle on 34th Street (1994), and Clint Eastwood's True Crime (1999), and series including Ally McBeal (2000) and The District (2001). His final acting appearance came in the 2005 drama Yesterday's Dreams.

Personal life
Windom married Carol Keyser in New York City in August 1947. They worked together and he worked for her father selling insurance for three years. They divorced in December 1955. In 1958, he married actress Barbara Joyce. She was six years older than Windom. He soon moved to California for work. Windom said the marriage lasted three years, although the divorce was not finalized until 1963. A few weeks later, he married his third wife, Barbara Clare. She was the granddaughter of MGM's founder, Louis B. Mayer, and 11 years Windom's junior. He became stepfather to Barbara's two daughters. His first child, Rachel, was born in 1964. Windom and Barbara divorced in 1968. In October 1969, he married his fourth wife, Jacqulyn D. Hopkins, 19 years his junior. They had two daughters: Heather Juliet (1970) and Hope Teresa (1973).

In 1974, Windom met Patricia (Fehrle) Tunder while shooting a TV movie; 12 years his junior, she was working for the production company at the time. Almost a year later, in July 1975, he filed for divorce from Jacqulyn. Windom married Patricia in 1975. In 1978, Windom welcomed his final child, a son named Rebel Russell. 

Windom was a tournament chess player, a sailor, a tennis player, and a life member of the United States Chess Federation.

Death
Windom died on August 16, 2012, at age 88 at his home in Woodacre, California, from congestive heart failure.

Filmography

Films

Television

Theatre

Awards and nominations

References

External links

 
 
 
 
 
 The William Windom Tribute Site

Male actors from New York City
American male film actors
American male television actors
American male stage actors
United States Army personnel of World War II
United States Army soldiers
Outstanding Performance by a Lead Actor in a Comedy Series Primetime Emmy Award winners
Williams College alumni
Male actors from Los Angeles
People from Woodacre, California
20th-century American male actors
21st-century American male actors
1923 births
2012 deaths
Paratroopers
Deaths from congestive heart failure
Military personnel from New York City